Warwick Rural District was a rural district of Warwickshire, England. It was created in 1894, and covered an area around, but not including, Warwick. It expanded in 1932 with the abolition of Foleshill Rural District and Solihull Rural District.

The district was abolished in 1974 under the Local Government Act 1972, merging with Warwick, Leamington Spa, and Kenilworth to form the modern non-metropolitan district of Warwick.

External links
Warwick RD on visionofbritain.org.uk

History of Warwickshire
Districts of England created by the Local Government Act 1894
Districts of England abolished by the Local Government Act 1972
Rural districts of England